Barno Mirzaeva (born 23 August 1991) is an Uzbekistani karateka. In 2014, she reached the final in the women's kumite 61 kg event at the Asian Games and she won the silver medal.

Career 

In 2013, she won the gold medal in the women's kumite 61 kg event at the Asian Karate Championships held in Dubai, United Arab Emirates.

At the 2017 Islamic Solidarity Games held in Baku, Azerbaijan, she won one of the bronze medals in the women's kumite 61 kg event.

In 2018, she won one of the bronze medals in the women's kumite 61 kg event at the Asian Games held in Jakarta, Indonesia.

Achievements

References

External links 
 

Living people
1991 births
Place of birth missing (living people)
Uzbekistani female karateka
Karateka at the 2010 Asian Games
Karateka at the 2014 Asian Games
Karateka at the 2018 Asian Games
Asian Games medalists in karate
Asian Games silver medalists for Uzbekistan
Asian Games bronze medalists for Uzbekistan
Medalists at the 2010 Asian Games
Medalists at the 2014 Asian Games
Medalists at the 2018 Asian Games
Islamic Solidarity Games medalists in karate
Islamic Solidarity Games competitors for Uzbekistan
21st-century Uzbekistani women